Haas G (born Carlos Evans, aka Fantom of the Beat) is a Staten Island-based hip hop musician. Haas G was part of the 1990s rap duo The U.M.C.'s, and as Carlos Evans, he is credited as producer of the hit "Magic Stick" (Lil' Kim featuring 50 Cent).

Biography
Opening the door for Staten Island Hip-Hop, Fantom of the Beat, born Carlos Evans, began his musical career as Haas G, part of the hip-hop duo UMC’s. In the early 1990s UMC’s won acclaim for their first single “Blue Cheese.” (#1 Billboard rap single) Soon after, the second single, “One to Grow On” became Billboard’s #1 Rap Song. (#2 Billboard rap single). Fantom is credited with producing songs on both of the UMC’s albums “Fruits of Nature” and “Unleashed.” 

Music, according to Fantom is the universal language. He credits a lifetime of exposure to a variety of genres for his success as a producer. His production credits, through Fantom of the Beat, span many artists in the hip-hop world including Sadat X, Raekwon, Inspectah Deck, G.Snyder, Ab.Money, Mic Handz, and Ms. Toi. He’s worked with some of the world’s most respected labels such as Def Jam Records, Aftermath Records, Koch Entertainment, Epic Records, and Universal Records.  He produced Ghostface Killah’s “Apollo Kids” track from the Supreme Clientele album. This song helped turn Ghostface’s solo career around, with critics calling it his “street credible resurrection song,” and in addition, he produced “Take it Off” for Busta Rhymes on the album E.L.E. (Extinction Level Event): The Final World Front which is widely considered Busta’s best effort for its sequencing and quality material.

Fantom’s credentials also include “Magic Stick” which he produced for Lil’ Kim and 50 Cent. This track was one of the most played songs in crossover urban markets and reached the #2 spot on the Billboard Hot 100 chart.

"Magic Stick" was featured in the (2005) movie, King's Ransom, and also appears on the soundtrack for the movie Now You See Me 2, starring Jesse Eisenberg and Morgan Freeman.

Fantom continues to stretch his production talents to include his trademark style combining elements of the late 1960s and 1970s, creating sounds which represent the struggle and the voice of the inner city. He takes his life experiences and applies them to music creating sounds that, in essence, are capable of moving people to take action.

“Music is a substantial part of my life; it’s how I express my fears, my sadness and happiness, my everything. My music is raw emotion,” Fantom says. “The passion I feel for music shows through in everything I create."

Discography

Albums

With The U.M.C.s 
 Fruits of Nature (Wild Pitch/EMI Records, 1991)U.S. R&B & Hip Hop #32U.S. Heat Seakers chart #36
 Unleashed (The U.M.C.'s album) (Wild Pitch/EMI Records, 1994)U.S. R&B & Hip Hop #63

Singles

With The U.M.C.'s 
 "#NUDont" (2014)
 "Tried To Tell Ya'" (2014) 
 "Blue Cheese" (1991)
 "One to Grow On" (1991)

As producer 
 E.L.E. (Extinction Level Event): The Final World FrontTrack listing: Take It Off    (Busta Rhymes, 1998)
 Supreme ClienteleTrack listing: Apollo Kids (Ghostface Killah, 1999)
 That Girl (Ms Toi, 2001)
 Guess Who's Back?Track listing: Rotten Apple (50 Cent, 2002)
 La Bella MafiaTrack listing: Magic Stick (Lil' Kim featuring 50 Cent, 2003)
 The Movement (Inspectah Deck album) Track listing: City High (Inspectah Deck, 2003)
 The Movement (Inspectah Deck album) Track listing: Get Right (Inspectah Deck, 2003)
 The Movement (Inspectah Deck album) Track listing: It's Like That (Inspectah Deck, 2003)
 The Movement (Inspectah Deck album) Track listing: U Wanna Be (Inspectah Deck, 2003)
 The Movement (Inspectah Deck album) Track listing: Framed (Inspectah Deck, 2003)
 The Movement (Inspectah Deck album) Track listing: Bumpin' and Grindin (Inspectah Deck, 2003)
 The Movement (Inspectah Deck album) Track listing: The Stereotype (Inspectah Deck, 2003)
 More FishTrack listing: Miguel Sanchez (Ghostface Killah, 2006)
 More FishTrack listing: Street Opera (Ghostface Killah, 2006)
 More FishTrack listing: Blue Armor (Ghostface Killah, 2006)
 More FishTrack listing: Cuban Chronicles (Raekwon, 2007)
 Cynthia's Son Track listing: No Luv (Inspectah Deck, 2014)

Features 
 The Cleveland ShowBrown Magic Episode (2/19/2012)Track listing: Magic Stick
 King's Ransom (film)SoundtrackTrack listing: Magic Stick    (2005)
 Now You See Me 2SoundtrackTrack listing: Magic Stick    (2016)

References

1971 births
Living people
Musicians from New York (state)